The Reiman Pedestrian Bridge is a cable-stayed footbridge in downtown Milwaukee, Wisconsin that spans Lincoln Memorial Drive. It connects the Milwaukee Art Museum on the lakeshore to the east side of the downtown's central business district by way of O'Donnell Park, a multi-use park complex.  The bridge was built in 2001 as part of a major expansion to the museum that included the Quadracci Pavilion.  Both the bridge and Quadracci Pavilion were designed by Santiago Calatrava, the first such structures built in the United States.

References 
 "Quadracci Pavilion building tour"
 "Structurae: Milwaukee Art Museum Pedestrian Bridge (2001)"
 "Bridgehunter.com: Reiman Bridge"

Bridges in Wisconsin
Buildings and structures in Milwaukee
Bridges completed in 2001
Cable-stayed bridges in the United States
Pedestrian bridges in the United States
Bridges by Santiago Calatrava